The Athens State Orchestra is a Greek symphony orchestra based in Athens, which is consistently ranked in the top handful of orchestras of the country.

Principal conductors 
 Filoktitis Εkonomidis (1942–1957)
 Theodoros Vavagiannis (1957–1969)
 Andreas Paridis (1969–1975)
 Manos Hadjidakis (1976–1982)
 Yannis Ioannidis (1983–1989)
 Alexandros Symeonidis (1989–1995)
 Aris Garoufalis (1995–2004)
 Byron Fidetzis (2004–2011)
 Vassilis Christopoulos (2011–2014)
 Stefanos Tsialis (2014–2020)
 Lukas Karytinos (2020– )

References

External links 

 Official website

Greek symphony orchestras